A legitimate military target is an object, structure, individual, or entity that is considered to be a valid target for attack by belligerent forces according to the law of war during an armed conflict.

Overview
Protocol I to the Geneva Conventions, Article 52, provides for the general protection of civilian objects, hindering attacks to military objectives in a war between two or more belligerents. Article 52 states, "In so far as objects are concerned, military objectives are limited to those objects which by their nature, location, purpose or use make an effective contribution to military action and whose total or partial destruction, capture or neutralization, in the circumstances ruling at the time, offers a definite military advantage."

Any attack must be justified by military necessity: an attack or action must be intended to help in the military defeat of the enemy, it must be an attack on a military objective, and the harm caused to civilians or civilian property must be proportional and not "excessive in relation to the concrete and direct military advantage anticipated".

Some targets are clearly legitimate, including all military personnel directly engaging in hostilities on behalf of a belligerent party who are not hors de combat or are not members of a neutral country. Some civilian infrastructure, such as rail tracks, roads, ports, airports, and telecommunications used by the military for communications or transporting assets, are all considered to be legitimate military targets.

The legal situation becomes more nuanced and ambiguous if the harm to civilians or civilian property is "excessive in relation to the concrete and direct military advantage anticipated". During World War II, there was a song called a thing-ummy-bob, which contains the lines "And it's the girl that makes the thing that holds the oil, that oils the ring that works the thing-ummy-bob, that's going to win the war". Whether such a girl is a legitimate target is an area that probably has to be decided on a case-by-case basis. However, Protocol I suggests that if it is not clear, then the parties to the conflict should err on the side of caution, as Article 52 states: "In case of doubt whether an object which is normally dedicated to civilian purposes, such as a place of worship, a house, or other dwelling or a school, is being used to make an effective contribution to military action, it shall be presumed not to be so used".

Notes

References

Law of war